Mbaye Leye (born 1 December 1982) is a Senegalese football manager and former professional footballer who played as a striker. He is the manager of Belgian club Zulte Waregem. Born in Senegal, Leye started his professional career in France before moving to Belgium in 2007. He played in Belgium until his retirement in 2019, finishing his playing career with Mouscron. As a player, he represented the Senegal national team.

Playing career 

Leye played for Standard Liège from 2010 to 2012, scoring 11 goals in 56 games. He helped them to win the Belgian Cup in 2011.

He also won the Belgian Cup with KAA Gent in 2010 and in 2017 with Zulte Waregem where he had three spells.

Over the course of his professional career in Belgium, Leye netted 124 goals in 369 Belgian top flight league games and featured in 21 European cup matches scoring three goals.

At international level, he was capped seven times by Senegal.

Coaching career 
Leye began his coaching career in June 2019 at his former club, Standard Liège. On 4 October 2021, he was fired by Standard Liège, following four losses in the preceding five games.

Before the 2022–23 season, Leye was hired by Zulte Waregem.

Career statistics

Managerial statistics

Honours 
Gent
 Belgian Cup: 2009–10

Standard Liège
 Belgian Cup: 2010–11

Zulte Waregem
 Belgian Cup: 2016–17

Individual
 Belgian Ebony Shoe: 2013

References

External links
 NFT Profile
 

1982 births
Living people
People from Kaffrine Region
Senegalese footballers
Senegalese football managers
Senegal international footballers
FC Lorient players
Amiens SC players
S.V. Zulte Waregem players
K.A.A. Gent players
Standard Liège players
K.S.C. Lokeren Oost-Vlaanderen players
Ligue 2 players
Belgian Pro League players
Senegalese expatriate footballers
Senegalese expatriate sportspeople in France
Expatriate footballers in France
Senegalese expatriate sportspeople in Belgium
Expatriate footballers in Belgium
Association football forwards
Senegalese expatriate football managers
Expatriate football managers in Belgium
Standard Liège managers
S.V. Zulte Waregem managers
Belgian Pro League managers